Robert J. Pellegrini is an American psychologist, Professor Emeritus of Psychology at San Jose State University.

Biography
He holds a BA degree from  Clark University, and MA and PhD degrees from  the University of Denver, He had  pre-doctoral internships at the University of Colorado School of Medicine, Children's Asthmatic Research Institute and National Jewish Hospitals in Denver, and did  post-doctoral work at Stanford University.

He also held positions at   SJSU as Associate Dean for Research, Director of Sponsored Programs, and Psychology Department Chair.

He co-founded a BA degree program at CTF, Soledad.

He was a president of the Western Psychological Association.

Research
His initial research was on nonverbal measures of affect as indices of racial prejudice. His later research included studies of the effect of color on human functioning in both laboratory and applied settings,   studies of impression-formation, political identification and attributed causes of homelessness, the medical significance of adult attachment styles, the effects of anticipated opportunity on performance, and the storied roots of identity formation.

Pellegrni's has authored Identities for Life and Death: Can we save us from our toxically-storied selves? and its associated Identities for Life and Death Forever Daily Message Calendar.

Publications

Pellegrini, R. J. Bringing psychology to life. San Jose, CA: Canyon Ridge Press,1996 .
 
Pellegrini, R. J. Study Guide To Accompany Uba/Huang's Psychology. New York: Addison Wesley Longman Publishers, Inc. (1999) 

Pellegrini, R. J., and Sarbin, T. R. (Eds.) Between fathers and sons: Critical incident narratives in the development of men's lives. Binghamton, NY: The Haworth Press, Inc. (2002) ).

Pellegrini, R. J. Identities for life and death: Can we save us from our toxically storied selves. Peoria, AZ: Intermedia Publishing,  (2011) (www.impbrbooks.com).

External links
http://www.sjsu.edu/people/robert.pellegrini/
http://www.sjsu.edu/people/robert.pellegrini/publications/

21st-century American psychologists
People from the San Francisco Bay Area
Stanford University alumni
Living people
Year of birth missing (living people)